The Alibi Club is a private, traditional private club in Washington, D.C. Its members consist of the Washington elite, including presidents, senators, and diplomats, among other prominent figures.

History
In 1884, seven Washingtonians founded the Alibi Club, a private social club consisting of prominent political and social figures. Its name derived from the club practice of providing an alibi when the whereabouts of a member was questioned by the member's family. The club's founding purpose was to foster "mutual improvement, education, and enlightenment" among members of Washington society. Membership also extended to out of town figures from New York City, Boston and Philadelphia, most likely to share information between communities and help in the development of strategies to address civic issues. Throughout its history, it has hosted numerous world leaders, including King Leopold of Belgium, Prince Albert of Belgium, Prince Henry of Prussia, and Viceroy Li Hung Chang.

Clubhouse
The first clubhouse was situated at 17th and Pennsylvania Avenue, NW. Since 1886, the club has occupied a three-story, brick townhouse blocks away from the White House. The clubhouse is furnished with donated memorabilia and artifacts that cover nearly every available section of wall on the first two floors. The clubhouse is also notable as a well-preserved example of residential architecture in a commercial district, and was added to the National Register of Historic Places on October 21, 1994. In 2018 the building was listed as a vacant property.

Membership
Membership is limited to fifty, with new members admitted upon unanimous vote after the death of a previous member. Membership is not revealed to outsiders, and the first public notice of membership is often in a member's obituary.

Some of the Alibi Club's most prominent members have included: President George H. W. Bush, his father, Senator Prescott Bush, Supreme Court Justices Potter Stewart and Stanley F. Reed, Allen Dulles and John Foster Dulles, Speaker of the House Nicholas Longworth, and General George C. Marshall.

David M. Abshire
David Acheson
Dean Acheson
Theodore Achilles
Lamar Alexander
Chandler Anderson
Larz Anderson
Warren R. Austin
Truxtun Beale
Gist Blair
Robert Woods Bliss
Frederick N. Brooke
David K.E. Bruce
George H. W. Bush
Prescott Bush
George E. Corcoran
Thomas Gardiner Corcoran
Dwight F. Davis
Allen Dulles
John Foster Dulles
James Dunn
Walter Edge
George A. Garrett
Charles C. Glover III
Gordon Gray
Cary Grayson
Joseph Grew
Alfred Gruenther
Frederick Hale
George Hamilton, Jr.
Nelson Hartson
Christian Herter
William Hibbs
Archibald Hopkins
Walter Bruce Howe
David B. Karrick
Samuel Kaufman
John Kean
Emory S. Land
Nicholas Longworth
Robert A. Lovett
George C. Marshall
Clarence Moore
Benjamin Mosby McKelway
John Lord O'Brian
Thomas Nelson Page
Stanley F. Reed
Henry Roosevelt
Jules Henri de Sibour
Potter Stewart
James W. Symington
Maxwell Taylor
J.W. Wadsworth
John F. Wilkins
Clarence R. Wilson
Blanton Winship
Jerauld Wright
William M. Wright
Vishnu V. Ramaswamy
John Adams Bross
C. Boyden Gray

See also
 List of traditional gentlemen's clubs in the United States
 National Register of Historic Places listings in central Washington, D.C.

References

External links
 

1884 establishments in Washington, D.C.
Clubhouses on the National Register of Historic Places in Washington, D.C.
Clubs and societies in Washington, D.C.
Houses completed in 1869
Houses on the National Register of Historic Places in Washington, D.C.
Italianate architecture in Washington, D.C.
Gentlemen's clubs in the United States